Maturation is the process of becoming mature; the emergence of individual and behavioral characteristics through growth processes over time.

Maturation may refer to:

Science 
 Developmental psychology
 Foetal development
 Maturity (geology), in petroleum geology
 Maturation, as a threat to internal validity of an experiment
 Tissue maturation, an aspect of developmental biology
 The final stages of cellular differentiation of cells, tissues, or organs

See also 
 Expiration (disambiguation)
 Maturity (disambiguation)
 Mature (disambiguation)